A special charter allows a New Jersey municipality to operate under a charter that differs from those of the traditional forms of government or the many options available under the Faulkner Act. Under the terms of the New Jersey State Constitution of 1947 and the Faulkner Act of 1950, a municipality may obtain a special charter form from the New Jersey Legislature, providing a unique form of governmental organization for that community.

Municipalities

In a July 2011 report, the Rutgers University Center for Government Studies listed 11 municipalities as operating under a special charter:

 Bloomfield, New Jersey
 Englewood, New Jersey
 Gloucester City, New Jersey
 Hackettstown, New Jersey
 Hardyston Township, New Jersey
 Middletown Township, New Jersey
 Montville, New Jersey
 Plainfield, New Jersey
 South Orange, New Jersey
 Tenafly, New Jersey
 Westfield, New Jersey

Other municipalities include:
 Boonton, New Jersey
 Summit, New Jersey

References

External links
New Jersey State League of Municipalities
New Jersey League of Women Voters

Local government in New Jersey
New Jersey law